Alexandre Rignault (14 February 1901 – 2 April 1985) was a French actor. He appeared in more than a hundred films between 1931 and 1985.

Selected filmography

External links 
 

1901 births
1985 deaths
Male actors from Paris
20th-century French male actors